Enteromius tanapelagius is a species of ray-finned fish in the genus Enteromius. It is endemic to Ethiopia.

Footnotes 

 

Enteromius
Fish of Lake Tana
Endemic fauna of Ethiopia
Fish described in 2000